The 2019–20 Czech First League, known as the Fortuna liga for sponsorship reasons, was the 27th season of the Czech Republic's top-tier football league. The defending champions were Slavia Prague, who won their fifth Czech title in previous season. This season was the second one with a new league structure in which 16 clubs play each other home and away, until the league is split up in championship, Europa League and relegation groups.

Season events
On 12 March, the League Football Association announced that all Fortuna liga games had been postponed for the foreseeable future due to the COVID-19 pandemic.

After 2 months, on 12 May, the League Football Association announced that the Fortuna liga would resume on 25 May. The regular season concluded on 14 June 2020.

On 23 July, when the Champions group and the Europa League playoffs have already been finalized, the SFC Opava - a team currently holding 15th place in the table has been suspected for corona virus by one of their team members. The Czech League Football Association said it is not possible to complete the league's group rescue as a result of this, and the team was forced to quarantine. None of the three teams in danger of falling into the second league, namely Karviná, Opava and Příbram, will be relegated. The victorious Pardubice, and the second-place Zbrojovka Brno will advance to the first league, while third-place Dukla Praha will not. The relegation group matches have been suspended and no team was relegated.

Teams

Team changes

Stadiums and locations

Regular season

League table

Results
Each team plays home-and-away against every other team in the league, for a total of 30 matches played each.

Championship group
Points and goals were carried over in full from the regular season.

Europa League play-offs
Teams placed between 7th and 10th position will take part in the Europa league play-offs. The best of them will play against the fourth-placed or fifth-placed of the championship play-offs to determine the Europa League play-off winners. The winners will qualify for the second qualifying round of the 2020–21 UEFA Europa League.

Final

Relegation group
Points and goals were carried over in full from the regular season. The relegation group was scheduled to conclude on 7 July but due to three players from MFK Karviná testing positive for COVID-19, the last two rounds of matches were postponed to 23 and 26 July. Then, due to one player from SFC Opava testing positive for COVID-19, the last two rounds of matches were not played. As a consequence, no team was relegated and number of teams for 2020–2021 season was increased from 16 to 18.

Number of teams by region

Top scorers

Awards

Monthly Awards

Annual awards

Attendances

See also
2019–20 Czech Cup
2019–20 Czech National Football League

References

External links
 

2019–20 in European association football leagues
1
2019-20
Czech First League